José López (born 23 August 1930) is a Cuban wrestler. He competed in the men's freestyle featherweight at the 1948 Summer Olympics.

References

External links
 

1930 births
Possibly living people
Cuban male sport wrestlers
Olympic wrestlers of Cuba
Wrestlers at the 1948 Summer Olympics
Place of birth missing (living people)
Wrestlers at the 1951 Pan American Games
Pan American Games bronze medalists for Cuba
Pan American Games medalists in wrestling
Medalists at the 1951 Pan American Games
20th-century Cuban people